A one-shot film (also one-take film, single-take film, continuous shot feature film) is a full-length movie filmed in one long take by a single camera, or manufactured to give the impression it was.

Use and theory 
In a 2019 article, discussing the award-winning film 1917 (2019), Eric Grode of The New York Times wrote that very long takes were becoming popular in more mainstream films "as a sobering reminder of temporality, a virtuosic calling card, a self-issued challenge or all of the above", also citing the Academy Award-winner from several years prior, Birdman (2014).

History 
Grode notes that before such films as 1917 and Birdman, the idea of experimenting with long uninterrupted takes had a history of over 80 years, with Alfred Hitchcock being a pioneer. Aside from early experiments like Young and Innocent and Notorious, the most famous early example of a film that extensively uses long takes is the 1948 Rope, which was shot in mainly seven-to-ten–minute continuous takes (the physical limit of film stock at the time) that appear as four long takes of around 15 to 20 minutes each, close to the maximum length allowed by the cinema projectors of the time. Reportedly, James Stewart, star of Rope, did not like the long takes and apparently muttered on set that the cameras were more important than the actors. Hitchcock intended to shoot the film as if it were a play, and timed five of the ten segments to allow for hidden edits behind furniture; elaborate camera and actor choreography was used. He wrote Rope this way because he felt "if time passed between cuts, the suspense of whether the body was still in the trunk would be lost".

Grode also examines the 1958 film Touch of Evil as an example, though only its three-minute opening sequence is shot in real time. However, the use of a real-time ticking bomb through the single shot is seen as a standard.

Notable examples

Actual "one shot"

Edited to appear as "one shot"

See also
 Digital cinema
 Digital cinematography
 List of films shot on digital video prior to 2015
 List of one-shot music videos
 Still image film

References

Cinematic techniques
Film and video technology
Digital movie cameras